The Lone Star Grand Prix was an American Le Mans Series sports car race that took place at JAGFlo Speedway at Reliant Park in Houston, Texas, United States. The Lone Star Grand Prix was part of the Grand Prix of Houston race weekend.  The event took place in 2006 and 2007.  The 2008 event was cancelled following the merger of the Champ Car World Series and Indy Racing League.

Winners

References

External links
 Grand Prix of Houston Homepage
 Reliant Park Homepage

 
Sports car races
Auto races in the United States
Sports in Houston
American Le Mans Series races
Recurring sporting events established in 2006
Recurring events disestablished in 2007
Motorsport competitions in Texas